Elliott Stooke (born 10 September 1993) is an English professional rugby union player. His playing position is Lock.

Stooke was called up to the England Saxons squad on 20 January 2014 as injury cover for Graham Kitchener.

On 19 January 2016. It was announced Stooke would leave Gloucester for local rivals Bath Rugby from the 2016-17 Aviva Premiership season. On 9 February 2016. Stooke was signed by London Irish on loan for the remainder of the 2015-16 season, he returned to Gloucester for a few weeks in March/April before returning to Irish for the remainder of the season.

After a slow start at Bath, Stooke cemented himself as a reliable figure in the second row of the Bath scrum during the 2016/17 Aviva Premiership Rugby Season. Making 30 starts in all competitions.

Stooke had his first taste of leadership, calling the line-outs on 16 February 2018 as Bath took on Newcastle Falcons at Kingston Park. Absent (on England duty) teammate, Charlie Ewels, ordinarily took the role.

Stooke was the only player in the Bath squad to play in all 22 games, during the 2017-18 Premiership Rugby season.

In March 2019 Stooke was called up as cover to England's Six Nations squad.

On 10 May 2021, Stooke would leave Bath to join Premiership rivals Wasps from the 2021-22 season.

On 20 May 2022, Stooke experienced a fibula fracture causing him to leave the pitch and to miss the rest of the season l 

Wasps entered administration on 17 October 2022 and Stooke was made redundant along with all other players and coaching staff.

References

External links
Wasps RFC Profile

1993 births
Living people
English rugby union players
Gloucester Rugby players
Bath Rugby players
Rugby union players from Worcester
Rugby union locks